The North Fork Smith River is a  tributary of the Smith River in Douglas County in the U.S. state of Oregon. It begins in the Central Oregon Coast Range near Roman Nose Mountain and flows generally southwest to meet the larger river  from its confluence with the Umpqua River at Reedsport.  The entire course of the North Fork lies within the Siuslaw National Forest.

Recreation
The North Fork supports populations of cutthroat trout and steelhead suitable for sportfishing. Bank access is good where land owners allow it, but anglers often prefer drift fishing from boats.

The North Fork Smith Trail, open all year, runs along the North Fork for  through a forest of old-growth Douglas firs to Lower Kentucky Falls along Kentucky Creek. There it connects to the  Kentucky Falls Trail, which follows the creek through old-growth to Upper Kentucky Falls. Lower Kentucky Falls is a  twin fall at the confluence of the river and the creek.

Tributaries
Named tributaries of the North Fork Smith River from source to mouth are Jump, Sheep Herder, and Kentucky creeks. Then the Middle Fork North Fork Smith River and the West Branch North Fork Smith River followed by Paxton, Harlan, Sulphur, Chapman, Georgia, and McKinney creeks. Then come Edmonds, Johnson, Dry, Straddle, and Railroad creeks.

See also
 List of rivers of Oregon

References

External links
Trail map –United States Forest Service
Umpqua Watershed Council

Rivers of Oregon
Rivers of Douglas County, Oregon
Oregon Coast Range